Gilbert Odd (1902 – 12 May 1996) was a British boxing historian and sportswriter.

Odd boxed briefly as an amateur, then at 18 turned his sights on the sports writing side of the game, becoming a ringside correspondent for the weekly magazine, Boxing.  Starting in 1941 and continuing for ten years after, he served as Editor in Chief of Boxing News, the successor to Boxing.  In 1944, he began assisting in the publication of The Boxers Annual, which compiled the records of both professional and amateur boxers.  In addition, he began the publication of a similar record book, the Boxing News Authors' and Record Book.  Throughout the process of compiling and publishing these records, Odd became known as the best boxing historian in England.

Odd was a member of the British Boxing Board of Control from 1961 to 1969 and became a founding member of the Boxing Writers' Club.  He also is the only journalist to be made an honorary member of the National Sporting Club.  Odd was enshrined in the International Boxing Hall of Fame in 1995.  He retired to Northiam, where he lived until his death in 1996.

Bibliography

Odd has written literally hundreds of articles on boxing for various publications.  In addition, he has published over a dozen books, among them:
Ring Battles of the Century (1949) -- ASIN B0006DCTZA
Was the Referee Right? (1952)
Debatable Decisions (1953)
Great moments in sport: heavyweight boxing—
Boxing, the Great Champions (1974) -- 
Great moments in sport: Boxing : cruisers to mighty atoms (1974) -- 
Ali—The Fighting Prophet (1975) -- 
The Fighting Blacksmith (1976) -- 
Boxing, the Inside Story (1978) -- 
Lee Harvey, Prince of Boxers (1978) -- 
The Woman in the Corner (1978) -- 
Kings of the ring : 100 years of world heavyweight boxing (1985) -- 
The Encyclopedia of Boxing (1989) --

References
International Boxing Hall of Fame enshrinees: Gilbert Odd
Roberts, James B. and Skutt, Alexander G. (2006). "Gilbert Odd." The Boxing Register: International Boxing Hall of Fame Official Record Book,4th ed, p. 739.

1902 births
1996 deaths
English sportswriters
Boxing writers
20th-century English historians
People from Northiam